The 1993 National Scout Jamboree was the 13th national Scout jamboree of the Boy Scouts of America and was held from August 4-10, 1993, at Fort A.P. Hill, Virginia.

Statistics
This event was attended by 34,449 scouts.

List of sub-camps
The 1993 National Scout Jamboree was divided into four regional encampments which consisted of a total of 19 sub-camps.  Each subcamp consisted of approximately 1300 participants each dispersed among 30-40 troops.  Each troop occupied a campsite with dimensions of approximately  X 90 feet.  Each subcamp had a special patch depicting a historical flag.

Central region
Subcamp 1: Green Mountain
Subcamp 2: Rhode Island
Subcamp 3: Guilford Courthouse
Subcamp 4: French Fleur-de-lis

Western region
Subcamp 5: Union Jack
Subcamp 6: Grand Union
Subcamp 7: Fremont
Subcamp 8: Sons of Liberty
Subcamp 9: Gadsden

Southern region
Subcamp 15: Navy Jack
Subcamp 16: Serapis
Subcamp 17: Fort Moultrie
Subcamp 18: Lions & Castles
Subcamp 19: Commodore Perry

Northeast region
Subcamp 10: Bunker Hill
Subcamp 11: Bennington
Subcamp 12: Washington Cruisers
Subcamp 13: Phila, Light Horse
Subcamp 14: Taunton

Program
Jamboree attendees were able to participate in a number of activities.  Singer Lee Greenwood and performance group Up With People performed at the opening ceremony, and singer Louise Mandrell performed at the closing ceremony. A list of the main activities is given below.

Action centers
 "Action Alley"
 Air-Rifle
 Archery
 "Bikathalon"
 "Buckskin Games"
 "Confidence Course"
 Motocross
 "Patrol Challenge"
 Pioneering
 Trap Shooting
 Rappelling

Remote centers
 Conservation
 Fishing - More than 20,000 bass, channel catfish, bluegill and other fish were stocked in Fishhook Lake.

Aquatics
 "Raft Encounter"
 Racing Shell Run
 Canoe Sprint
 "Kayak Fun"
 Canoe Slalom
 "Discover Scuba"
 "Snorkel Search"

Exhibits and displays
 National Exhibits
 Merit Badge Midway
 Arts and Science Expo
 Brownsea Island Camp
 Daily Stage Shows
 Amateur Radio Station

Order of the Arrow Jamboree Rendezvous
The Order of the Arrow Jamboree Rendezvous was held on the evening of Monday, August 9.

Severe weather
A major rainstorm occurred on Friday, August 6 which caused localized flooding throughout Fort A. P. Hill and necessitated the cancellation of all Jamboree activities for the afternoon.

Newspaper
A daily newspaper entitled Jamboree Today was distributed to all jamboree participants to inform them of events at the jamboree.

References

1993 in Virginia
1993
August 1993 events in the United States
Boy Scouts of America